Trajan's Treacherous Trap (or Treacherous Trajan's Trap) is a play-by-mail game that was published by Flying Buffalo in 1979.

Development and gameplay
Trajan's Treacherous Trap was a fantasy role-playing game designed similarly to Flying Buffalo's dungeon adventures for solo players. The game was hand-moderated. Rick Loomis described it as a PBM version of Tunnels & Trolls. It was a "solo dungeon by mail" with basic elements of gameplay. Orders were multiple choice and turn sheets were normally short—about a page long.

Loomis ran the games and adjudicated the turns according to Tunnels & Trolls rules. Starting players were fighters with a sword. The setting was a "devilish dungeon designed to kill 999 out of 1000 players who enter". The dungeon's exit was on the bottom of its three levels. Loomis warned that solving the dungeon would be costly and challenging, but would earn a sizable reward. By mid-1979, Loomis stated that there were about 90 players.

Loomis wrote in the April 1982 issue of The Space Gamer that, even though "the game has been running for well over a year, no one has yet found the entrance to the second level". As of 1988, "only one person [had] ever survived the dungeon".

Reception
Stefan Jones reviewed Trajan's Treacherous Trap in The Space Gamer No. 37. Jones commented that "I can't really recommend Trajan's Treacherous Trap, unless you're rich, can't find anyone to game with, and find that no one will sell you any of the numerous solo dungeons available." M.T. Lunsford reviewed the game in February–March 1988 issue of D2 Report magazine. He noted it as a simple, but slow game that the publisher was winding down.

See also
 List of play-by-mail games

Notes

References

Bibliography
 

Fantasy role-playing games
Flying Buffalo games
Play-by-mail games